The 1867 City of Auckland West by-election was a by-election held  on 25 April 1867 in the  electorate during the 4th New Zealand Parliament. It was then a two-member electorate.

The by-election was caused by the resignation of the incumbent, James Williamson.

Patrick Dignan was nominated, and as there were no other nominations he was declared elected unopposed.

References

Auckland West 1867
1867 elections in New Zealand
May 1867 events
Politics of the Auckland Region